Züvüc (also, Zuvüc, Züvüç, Zuvich, and Zuvuch) is a village and municipality in the Lerik Rayon of Azerbaijan.  It has a population of 1,117.

References 

Populated places in Lerik District